The 2013 FIBA Europe Under-16 Championship was the 27th edition of the European Under-16 Basketball Championship. 16 teams participated in the competition, which was held in Kyiv, Ukraine, from 8 to 18 August 2013. Turkey were the defending champions.

Participating teams
  (Winners, 2012 FIBA Europe Under-16 Championship Division B)

  (Runners-up, 2012 FIBA Europe Under-16 Championship Division B)

  (3rd place, 2012 FIBA Europe Under-16 Championship Division B)

First round

The first-round groups draw took place on 8 December 2012 in Freising, Germany. In this round, sixteen teams are allocated in four groups of four teams each. The top three teams of each group will advance to the Qualifying Round. The last teams will play in the Classification Group G first, then in the 9th–16th place playoffs.

Group A

|}

Group B

|}

Group C

|}

Group D

|}

Second round
Twelve advancing teams from the First Round were allocated in two groups of six teams each. The top four teams of each group will advance to the quarterfinals. The last two teams of each group will play for the 9th–16th place against the teams from the Group G.

Group E

|}

Group F

|}

Classification Group G
The last team of each group of the First Round will compete in this Classification Round.

|}

9th – 16th Place Playoff

Classification games for 13th – 16th place

Classification games for 9th – 12th place

1st – 8th Place Playoff

Quarterfinals

Classification games for 5th – 8th place

Semifinals

Final classification games

Match for 15th place

Match for 13th place

Match for 11th place

Match for 9th place

Match for 7th place

Match for 5th place

Bronze medal match

Final

Final standings

All-Tournament Team

 Stefan Peno (MVP)
 Sviatoslav Mykhailiuk
 Xabier Lopez-Arostegui
 Milos Glisic
 Georgios Papagiannis

References

External links
FIBA Archive
FIBA Europe

FIBA U16 European Championship
2013–14 in European basketball
2013–14 in Ukrainian basketball
2013
2013
2010s in Kyiv